Samuel John Fox (September 28, 1854 – July 3, 1911) was an Ontario farmer and political figure. He represented Victoria West in the Legislative Assembly of Ontario as a Conservative member from 1898 to 1911.

He was born in Bowmanville, Canada West. He first entered the printing trade but later joined his father in brick making. Fox also became a tile maker. In 1877, he married Rosanna Free.

References 
 Canadian Parliamentary Guide, 1903, AJ Magurn

External links 

1854 births
1911 deaths
People from Clarington
Progressive Conservative Party of Ontario MPPs